Claix is a commune in the Isère department in southeastern France. It is part of the Grenoble urban unit (agglomeration).

Population

See also
Parc naturel régional du Vercors
Communes of the Isère department

References

Communes of Isère